111th Street–Morgan Park is one of two Metra railroad stations in the Morgan Park neighborhood of Chicago, Illinois, along the Beverly Branch of the Rock Island District Line,  from LaSalle Street Station, the northern terminus of the line. The station is named after 111th Street, although its address is 11046 South Hale Avenue between Monterey and Prospect Avenues; 111th Street runs in line with Monterey Avenue east of Morgan Park. In Metra's zone-based fare system, 111th Street is in zone C. As of 2018, 111th Street–Morgan Park is the 92nd busiest of Metra's 236 non-downtown stations, with an average of 548 weekday boardings.

As of 2022, 111th Street–Morgan Park is served by 20 trains in each direction on weekdays, by 10 inbound trains and 11 outbound trains on Saturdays, and by eight trains in each direction on Sundays.

Parking is available on both sides of the tracks along South Hale Avenue between 108th Place and Edmaire Street. It is also available on Homewood and Monterery Avenues behind South Hale Avenue, and at Prospect Park on Prospect Avenue and the northwest corner of Pryor and Homewood Avenues.

Bus connections
CTA
  112 Vincennes/111th

References

External links

Station from Prospect Avenue from Google Maps Street View
Station from 111th Street from Google Maps Street View

Metra stations in Chicago
Former Chicago, Rock Island and Pacific Railroad stations
Railway stations in the United States opened in 1892